Actina chalybea is a species of 'soldier flies' belonging to the family Stratiomyidae subfamily Beridinae.

Distribution
This species is present in most of Europe. Adults prefer shady and moist habitats.

Description
These flies have a metallic green thorax. The head is quite large and rounded, with small black antennae pointing forward. Palps are clearly visible. The eyes are green,  almost contiguous in males and clearly separated in females. Forehead and thorax are covered with long black hair. The scutellum has four black spines. The abdomen is flattened and the legs are black with femora partially yellow.

Biology
Adults can mostly be encountered from April through June.

Bibliography
 Keith Bayless -  Actina species
 Rozkošný, R. 1998. Chapter 24. Family Stratiomyidae. Manual Palaearct. Dipt. 2: 387–411.

References

External links

 Biolib
 Tout un monde

Stratiomyidae
Insects described in 1804
Diptera of Europe
Taxa named by Johann Wilhelm Meigen